José Morban (born December 2, 1979 in San Cristóbal, Dominican Republic) is a retired  Major League Baseball infielder.

Career
In December of 2002, the Minnesota Twins chose Morban in the Rule 5 Draft. Morban was previously a member of the Texas Rangers. To accommodate Morban on their roster, the Twins released David Ortiz.

Morban played in 61 games and had 10 hits in 71 at-bats.

References

External links

1979 births
Living people
Akron Aeros players
Arizona League Mariners players
Baltimore Orioles players
Bowie Baysox players
Buffalo Bisons (minor league) players
Calgary Vipers players
Charlotte Rangers players
Dominican Republic expatriate baseball players in Canada
Dominican Republic expatriate baseball players in the United States
Edmonton Capitals players
Edmonton Cracker-Cats players
Frederick Keys players
Gulf Coast Rangers players

Major League Baseball infielders
Major League Baseball players from the Dominican Republic
Oklahoma RedHawks players
Pulaski Rangers players
Savannah Sand Gnats players
Somerset Patriots players
Tacoma Rainiers players